John Robert Wiltshire (born 20 January 1952) is a former New Zealand first-class cricketer who played for Auckland and Central Districts between 1974 and 1984.

A lawyer, Wiltshire is a partner at Beattie Rickman Legal in Hamilton.

See also
 List of Auckland representative cricketers

References

External links
 

1952 births
Living people
Cricketers from Christchurch
Auckland cricketers
Central Districts cricketers
New Zealand cricketers
20th-century New Zealand lawyers
North Island cricketers
21st-century New Zealand lawyers